Football for All in Vietnam (FFAV) is a project in Vietnam started by the Football Association of Norway (Norges Fotballforbund, NFF) in Hanoi in 2001. The organization cooperates with the school authorities locally and nationally, as well as with the Vietnam Football Federation (VFF). The project was moved to Huế in 2003. The purpose is to make the schools a better place, as well as providing important life skills. The project has a strict focus on grass-roots football, where participation is based on interest, not skills. At the moment, the project has 110 football clubs in primary and secondary schools in Hue, with about 11,000 players. 50% of the players are girls.

References

External links
 
 Fotball for All (summary and link to full pdf)
 Football as a tool for life skills training at norway.org.vn.
 Using football to tackle HIV/AIDS in Vietnam

Football in Vietnam